Marc Camille Chaimowicz is a London-based contemporary artist whose works are in the Museum of Modern Art, Tate Modern, and Victoria and Albert Museum collections. His cross-disciplinary work in painting, drawing, collage, sculpture, installation, furniture, lighting, ceramics, textiles, and wallpaper challenges the categorical divisions between art and design.

Chaimowicz was born in 1947 in postwar Paris to a Polish Jewish father and French Catholic mother. The family moved to England when the artist was eight years old and settled in London, where he still lives and works. His first solo museum exhibition in the United States was held at the Jewish Museum in New York.

Solo exhibitions 
 Your Place or Mine.. The Jewish Museum, New York (2018)
 Serpentine Galleries, London (2016)

References

Year of birth missing (living people)
Living people
British painters
British contemporary artists
Jewish artists